The Dutchman's Shoes is a trophy awarded to the winner of the annual college football game between the Rensselaer Polytechnic Institute Engineers and the Union College Dutchmen since 1950.  As of the end of 2019, these two schools have played each other 117 times, making it the oldest football rivalry in the state of New York.

The trophy consists of a wooden base, with two clogs mounted on a small pedestal, with one painted cherry red with a white letter "R", and the other garnet with a white letter "U", for Rensselaer and Union, respectively.

History
The rivalry began in 1886, but the trophy wasn't introduced until 1950. The Dutchman's Shoes is a nod to the heritage of both schools, with a R for the Engineers and a U for the Dutchmen. Prior to the introduction of the trophy, Union dominated, winning 33 of the 47 pre-trophy meetings, with most with three streaks of at least 8 consecutive wins over RPI in that timespan. In terms of the trophy series, Union leads 50–23, but since the turn of the century, RPI has won 13 out of 21 matchups since 2000, including a 5 game win streak from 2013 to 2017. Due to it often being the season finale for both schools, the Dutchman's Shoes has been a de facto championship game for the Liberty League title and the automatic berth to the Division III playoffs. This includes the 2005 game, a 49–42 victory for Union, the highest scoring game in the history of the rivalry, as well as the most recent edition of the rivalry ending on a field goal by RPI as time expired to give them a 19–17 victory and the league title.

Game Results

See also 
 List of NCAA college football rivalry games

References

External links
  Report of the 2005 game

College football rivalry trophies in the United States
RPI Engineers football
Union Dutchmen football